Schocken may refer to:

 Schocken Books, a German publishing company
 Schocken Department Stores, a chain of German department stores

People
 Deganit Stern Schocken (born 1947), Israeli jewellery designer and art curator
 Gershom Schocken (1912–1990), Israeli journalist and politician
 Gideon Schocken (1919–1981), British-Israeli military officer
 Salman Schocken (1877–1959), German entrepreneur